Farol de D. Amélia (also: farol da ponta Machado, Ponta Machado Lighthouse) is a lighthouse in the southwestern point of the island of São Vicente in northwestern Cape Verde. It lies 3 km west of the village of São Pedro. The lighthouse is a white square tower with a lantern and a gallery, 14 m high. The lighthouse was completed in 1894.

Light characteristics
Characteristics: Light: 0.2s, occlusion: 4.8s, visible: 302°—172° (230°).

See also
List of lighthouses in Cape Verde
List of buildings and structures in São Vicente, Cape Verde

References

External links

Old post (Huelse)
2006 photo at Mindelo Infos

D. Amélia
Transport in São Vicente, Cape Verde
Lighthouses completed in 1894
1890s establishments in Cape Verde